Bayır (or Bayırköy) is a village  in Karaman Province, Turkey.

Its distance to Karaman is 
The population of the village  was 702 as of 2009. 
Bayır is a typical agricultural village. It was a grape producer. However recently cherry replaced grapes.

References

Villages in Karaman Province